is a Japanese manga series written and illustrated by Michi Urushihara. It was serialized in Shogakukan's seinen manga magazine Hibana from March 2015 to August 2016, with its chapters collected in two tankōbon volumes.

Publication
Written and illustrated by Michi Urushihara, Arigoke was serialized in Shogakukan's seinen manga magazine Hibana from March 6, 2015, to August 6, 2016. Shogakukan collected its chapters in two tankōbon volumes, released on January 12 and November 11, 2016.

Volume list

See also
Yorukumo, another manga series by the same author

References

Further reading

External links
 

Seinen manga
Shogakukan manga